The Ministry of Foreign Affairs (MoFA;  Wizārat al-Khārijīyah) is the ministry responsible for handling the Kingdom of Saudi Arabia's external relations. The ministry oversees "political, cultural and financial international relations" and monitors the Kingdom's diplomatic relations. It was created in 1930 by a royal decree issued by King Abdulaziz Al Saud, being the first ministerial body created by the King.

History
While consolidating the newly formed Kingdom of Nejd and Hejaz, King Abdulaziz, established foreign diplomatic relations by sending representatives and receiving delegations from various states. In 1926, he established the directorate general for foreign affairs in Mecca. A branch of the directorate was also opened in Jeddah. The first director general of foreign affairs was Abdullah Beg Al Damluji, who was also ruler of Hejaz at that time. 

In 1930, a royal decree was issued to elevate the directorate general to the ministry of foreign affairs. King Abdulaziz appointed his son, Prince Faisal, as the first foreign minister. The Kingdom of Saudi Arabia was formally established by King Abdulaziz in 1932.

Initially the ministry was made up of five departments, namely the private office and the departments of oriental affairs, administrative affairs, political affairs and consular affairs. The ministry began establishing diplomatic missions abroad. The first one was opened in Cairo in 1926 followed by another in London 1930. The number of missions increased from five in 1936 to 18 in 1951 and expanded further after that.

Aside from a brief interjection, Prince Faisal continued to serve even after he succeeded the throne as King. After his assassination in 1975, Faisal was succeeded as foreign minister by his son, Prince Saud. Saud was the longest-serving foreign minister of any country in current political times, The ministry launched a magazine, The Diplomat, in 2007.

It was rumored in 2010 that the next foreign minister would be Prince Turki Al Faisal, Saud's younger brother, after Saud retired, which however did not occur.

Senior officials
The senior officials in the ministry are as follows:

List of ministers

Ministers of Foreign Affairs 
The following is the list of foreign ministers since its foundation:

Ministers of State for Foreign Affairs
The ministers of state for foreign affairs served are as follows:
 Omar Al Saqqaf (1968–November 1974)
  Mohammad Ibrahim Massoud (November 1974–March 1975)
 Saud bin Faisal Al Saud (March 1975–October 1975) 
 Nizar Madani (2005–2018)
 Adel al-Jubeir (2018–)

Building
The building of the ministry is in Riyadh and was designed by Henning Larsen. It blends both vernacular and monumental styles of Islamic architecture. Larsen received the Aga Khan Award for Architecture in 1989 for his work on the building.

Built in 1984, building consists of meeting, conference and prayer rooms, a library and a banquet hall. Externally, the building appears as a fortress that was carved out of a single piece of stone.

See also

 Foreign relations of Saudi Arabia
 Politics of Saudi Arabia

References

External links
https://twitter.com/KSAMOFA

1930 establishments in Saudi Arabia
Ministries established in 1930
Foreign
Saudi Arabia
Foreign relations of Saudi Arabia